Stylidium lobuliflorum is a dicotyledonous plant, with a native range is concentrated in and around Kimberley in Western Australia and extends to the Northern Territory.

It belongs to the genus Stylidium (family Stylidiaceae) that was described by Ferdinand von Mueller in 1859. It is an erect annual plant that grows from 12 to 20 cm tall. Obovate or orbicular leaves, about 4-15 per plant, form basal rosettes. The leaves are generally 6–9.5 mm long and 4–6.5 mm wide. This species generally has one to three scapes and cymose inflorescences that are 12–20 cm long. Flowers are pink or mauve.

Its habitat has been reported as being seepage areas, streambanks, sandstone pavement, or sandy depressions. It flowers in the southern hemisphere from April to August. S. lobuliflorum is most closely related to S. schizanthum. Its conservation status has been assessed as secure.

See also 
 List of Stylidium species

References 

Asterales of Australia
Carnivorous plants of Australia
Flora of the Northern Territory
Eudicots of Western Australia
lobuliflorum
Plants described in 1859
Taxa named by Ferdinand von Mueller